Padarvand-e Sofla (also Romanized as Pādarvand-e Soflá; also known as Bādervand-e Soflá and Pā Darband) is a village in Rumiani Rural District, Suri District, Rumeshkhan County, Lorestan Province, Iran. At the 2006 census, its population was 714, in 139 families.

References 

Populated places in Rumeshkhan County